Manovo-Gounda St. Floris National Park is a national park and UNESCO World Heritage Site located in the Central African Republic prefecture Bamingui-Bangoran, near the Chad border. It was inscribed to the list of World Heritage Sites in 1988 as a result of the diversity of life present within it.

Notable species include black rhinoceroses, elephants, Sudan cheetahs, leopards, red-fronted gazelles, and buffalo, giraffes, lions; a wide range of waterfowl species also occurs in the northern floodplains.

The site is under threat due to its rare wildlife dying and animals species being wiped out. The western black rhinoceros that was indigenous to the Central African Republic has gone extinct in 2011. The site was added to the List of World Heritage in Danger after reports of illegal grazing and poaching by heavily armed hunters, who may have harvested as much as 80% of the park's wildlife. The shooting of four members of the park staff in early 1997 and a general state of deteriorating security brought all development projects and tourism to a halt.

The government of the Central African Republic proposed to assign site management responsibility to a private foundation. The preparation of a detailed state of conservation report and rehabilitation plan for the site was recommended by the World Heritage Committee at its 1998 session. People are working on breeding programs to revive the natural wildlife.

Location 
The park occupies most of the eastern end of Bamingui-Bangoran province in the north of the country. The park's northern boundary is the international border with Chad on the Aouk (Bahr) and Kameur Rivers. The Ndéle-Birao road runs through the park.

See also
 World Heritage Sites in Danger

References

Further reading 

 Barber, K., Buchanan, S. & Galbreath, P. (1980). An Ecological Survey of the St Floris National Park, Central African Republic. IPAD, US National Park Service, Washington D.C.
 Buchanan, S. & Schacht, W. (1979). Ecological investigations in the Manovo-Gounda-St Floris National Park ISBN B0007AWI2G. Ministre des Eaux, Forêts, Chasses et Pêches, Bangui. CAR
 CAR (1987). Nomination of the Parc National du Manovo-Gounda-St Floris for Inscription on the World Heritage List. Ministre du Tourisme, des Eaux, Forêts, Chasses et Pêches, Bangui. Central African Republic.
 CAR (1992). Sauvegarde de Manovo-Gounda St Floris. Patrimoine Mondial. Report of the Haut Commissaire de la Zone Franche Ecologique to UNESCO.
 Douglas-Hamilton, I., Froment, J., & Doungoubé, G. (1985). Aerial survey of wildlife in the North of the Central African Republic. Report to CNPAF, WWF, IUCN, UNDP and FAO.
 IUCN, (1988). World Heritage Nomination - Technical Evaluation. Report to WWF.
 IUCN/WWF Project 3019. Elephant Research and Management, Central African Republic. Various reports.
 IUCN (1997) State of Conservation of Natural World Heritage Properties. Report prepared for the World Heritage Bureau, 21st session, UNESCO, Paris. 7pp.
 Loevinsohn, M. (1977). Analyse des Résultats de Survol Aérien 1969/70. CAF/72/010 Document de Travail No.7. FAO, Rome.
 Loevinsohn, M.,Spinage, C. & Ndouté, J. (1978). Analyse des Résultats de Survol Aérien 1978. CAF/72/010 Document de Travail No.10. FAO, Rome.
 Pfeffer, P. (1983). Un merveilleux sanctuaire de faune Centrafricain: le parc national Gounda-Manovo-St. Floris. Balafon, 58. Puteaux, France.
 Spinage, C. (1976). Etudes Préliminaires du Parc National de Saint-Floris. CAF/72/010. FAO Rome.
 Spinage, C.(1981). Résumé des Aires de Faune Protégées et Proposées pour être Protégées. CAF/78/006 Document de terrain No.2. FAO, Rome.
 Spinage, C. (1981). Some faunal isolates of the Central African Republic. African Journal of Ecology 19(1-2): 125-132.
 Temporal, J-L. (1985). Rapport Final d'Activités dans le Parc National Manovo-Gounda-St Floris. Rapport du projet. Fonds d'Aide et Coopération.
 UNESCO World Heritage Committee (1997). Report on the 20th Session of the World Heritage Committee, Paris.
 UNESCO World Heritage Committee (1998). Report on the 21st Session of the World Heritage Committee, Paris.
 UNESCO World Heritage Committee (2001). Report on the 24th Session of the World Heritage Committee, Paris.
 UNESCO World Heritage Committee (2002). Report on the 25th Session of the World Heritage Committee, Paris

Attribution

External links 
 UNESCO Fact Sheet
 WCMC Natural Site Data Sheet

National parks of the Central African Republic
World Heritage Sites in the Central African Republic
Protected areas established in 1979
World Heritage Sites in Danger
Bamingui-Bangoran